The 1917–18 Georgia Bulldogs basketball team represents the University of Georgia during the 1917–18 college men's basketball season. The team captain of the 1917–18 season was Alfred W. Scott.

Schedule

|-

References

Georgia Bulldogs basketball seasons
Georgia
Bulldogs
Bulldogs